Lin Ching-yi (born 12 February 1974) is a Taiwanese physician and politician. She was first elected to the Legislative Yuan in 2016, then re-elected in 2022 by by-election.

Medical career
Lin studied medicine at National Taiwan University and Chung Shan Medical University. After earning her degree Lin worked at the Chung Shan Medical University Hospital as an obstetrician and gynecologist. For a decade, she was affiliated with the International Medical Service Program as a volunteer physician, and traveled to many nations, among them Nepal, India, Kyrgyzstan, and Tuvalu.

Political career
Lin was named to the Gender Equality Committee of the Executive Yuan in 2014, but stated that she could not ignore the effects of the Sunflower Student Movement and subsequently resigned the position. In May, Lin accepted an appointment to the Department of Women’s Development within the Democratic Progressive Party, calling the movement a political inspiration.

She was elected to the Legislative Yuan via the proportional representation ballot in January 2016. When the legislature established the UN Sustainable Development Goals Advisory Council in September 2017, Lin was named chairperson. In February 2019, she was appointed leader of the Democratic Progressive Party's  international affairs department. While acting as spokeswoman for the Tsai Ing-wen presidential reelection campaign in 2020, Lin was interviewed by Deutsche Welle. During the interview, she stated, "Constitutionally, and presently, we consider the Chinese Communist Party a menacing party and a menacing regime. They have missiles targeting us and have incessantly threatened to invade us by force ... To the nation, such a propositions are treasonous. They are unacceptable and will spark discussions on the limits of freedom of speech." Lin said supporters of Chinese unification "are calling for the nation’s sovereignty to be abandoned so that it can become a part of China", a view she considered treasonous "on many fronts". She subsequently resigned from Tsai's campaign.

The Democratic Progressive Party nominated Lin to run in the by-election on 3 November 2021. Twelve days later, Lin formally registered her candidacy. In addition to Lin Chin-yi and Kuomintang candidate Yen Kuan-heng, there were two independent candidates contesting the by-election, Lin Chin-lien and Lee Sheng-han. Chang Chiung-chun represented the Taiwan Stock Investors' Party. Lin won the by-election, finishing ahead of Yen and the other three minor party and independent candidates.

Legislative actions
Opposition parties repeatedly delayed consideration of the amendments, which were opposed by a number of labor organizations. criticized Lin's leadership, and engaged in physical confrontations over the bill, which passed in January 2018.

In December 2017, an amendment proposed by Lin to Article 82 of the Medical Act passed. The amendment enumerated the conditions under which medical professionals could face criminal charges if patients were harmed as a result of medical procedures. The legislature passed amendments to the HIV Infection Control and Patient Rights Protection Act in May 2018, one of which was initiated by Lin and exempted HIV+ people from disclosing their status to paramedics under certain conditions.

In December 2018, Lin proposed an amendment to the Referendum Act.

Political stances
Lin is supportive of pension reform, a larger tax on tobacco products, and amendments to marital law in Taiwan, so both men and women can consent to marriage at the age of eighteen. Lin and Yu Mei-nu have co-sponsored amendments to the Civil Code in an attempt to legalize same-sex marriage in Taiwan. Lin, who began attending parallel events hosted alongside the UN Commission on the Status of Women since 2012, has been critical of China's treatment of Taiwan on the international stage, and has backed calls for Taiwan to participate in intergovernmental organizations.

In February 2020, Lin complimented the Central Epidemic Command Center on its actions during the COVID-19 pandemic, and petitioned the Mainland Affairs Council to maintain its protocols when arranging evacuation flights from China.

References

1974 births
Living people
21st-century Taiwanese women politicians
Members of the 9th Legislative Yuan
Taiwanese obstetricians
Taiwanese gynaecologists
National Taiwan University alumni
Chung Shan Medical University alumni
Democratic Progressive Party Members of the Legislative Yuan
Party List Members of the Legislative Yuan
Taiwanese women physicians
Members of the 10th Legislative Yuan